Dale Levitski is an American chef and television personality. He is a former Top Chef television series alum.

Career

Television
Dale Levitski competed on Top Chef season 3. After having been one of the runners-up to Hung Huynh (along with Casey Thompson), Levitski was invited to compete again on Top Chef season 8 among the All-Stars.  He was eliminated in the third episode.

Chicago
After leaving the TV show, it took Levitski 18 months to get going on his next project. He rebounded to open Sprout in 2009, garnering praise, three stars from the Chicago Tribune, and a semifinalist nod from the James Beard Foundation for Best Chef: Midwest, something that might be considered a coup considering the glut of competition in the brutally tough Chicago-centric category."  A year after Sprout opened, the restaurant received a three star rating from the Chicago Tribune and also was named by Chicago Magazine as a Best Restaurant.  Levitski also opened a bistro called Frog n' Snail. Levitski started to have failing health due to the stress of the two restaurants. He decided to leave Chicago, and the two restaurants closed after his departure.

Nashville
In 2014 Levitski moved from Chicago to Nashville, Tennessee, and opened a new restaurant called Sinema in the old Melrose Theater.  He left the project in 2016.

References

External links
 Two-Bite Interview: Top Chef’s gay cheftestant, Dale Levitski
 Coming out on 'Top': Out chef Dale Levitski on his new Boystown spot
 Meet the (Gay) Top Chef Masters

American male chefs
Living people
People from Chicago
Top Chef contestants
Gay entertainers
American gay men
American LGBT entertainers
Year of birth missing (living people)
21st-century American LGBT people
LGBT chefs